Capital Economics is an independent economic research business based in London. The company produces written pieces of economic research as well as offering consultancy services, seminars, conferences and commissioned research projects. In 2012 it won the Wolfson Economics Prize for the best proposal on how a member state could leave the eurozone.

History
Roger Bootle founded Capital Economics in 1999. He and Capital Economics won the £250,000 Wolfson Economics Prize in 2012, "for the best plan for dealing with member states leaving the eurozone".

In 2014, Bootle sold a stake in Capital Economics to part of Lloyds Banking Group; the transaction valued his company at £70 million. Four years later, Phoenix Equity Partners purchased a majority stake in the consultancy from Bootle; this valued the business at £95 million. Bootle retained his chairman role and a reduced financial interest in Capital Economics.

Principal staff 

 Roger Bootle, Founder
 Neil Shearing, Group Chief Economist
 Mark Williams, Chief Asia Economist

References

Consulting firms established in 1999
Companies based in the City of Westminster
1999 establishments in England

pnb:کیپیٹل